The Church of Saint Catherine of Alexandria is located in Slovakia, in the village Topoľčianky. It is considered one of the most beautiful baroque churches in this country. Location of Topoľčianky is middle west Slovakia. It is 30 km away from the city of Nitra.

History
The church was built by comte Karol Keglevich. The architect for the main project was Melchior Hefele, who also designed the palace in the capital city of Bratislava. Construction of the church started in 1776 and it was finished in 1784. It is dedicated to Saint Catherine of Alexandria. A painting of her is placed above the main altar. This church is built in classic-baroque style. It is often sought out by local and foreign tourists especially on the saint's day.

Churches in Nitra Region
18th-century churches in Slovakia